Shannon Maurice Baker (born July 20, 1970) is a former American football wide receiver in the National Football League (NFL) who played for the Indianapolis Colts. He played college football for the Florida State Seminoles. He also played in the Canadian Football League (CFL) for the Winnipeg Blue Bombers and Saskatchewan Roughriders.

References

1971 births
Living people
American football wide receivers
Canadian football wide receivers
Indianapolis Colts players
Winnipeg Blue Bombers players
Saskatchewan Roughriders players
Florida State Seminoles football players